Spider-Man Live! - A Stunt Spectacular was the first full-length, live-action stage show based on the Marvel comic book character, Spider-Man, to appear in the United States.

Written and directed by Kevin Shinick and produced by Ultimate Shows & Entertainment and Marvel Enterprises, Inc, the show combined state of the art flying illusions, acrobatic and trapeze stunts, pyrotechnics and multimedia special effects into a theatrical production that embarked on a 40 city U.S. tour from 2002 - 2003.

Plot

The show portrays Spider-Man's history from the day that he gets bitten by the radioactive spider and throughout his high school years and relationship with Mary Jane Watson. By the end he has to save her from the Green Goblin.

Cast 

 Spider-Man - Colin Follenweider, Aaron Vexler, Brian Hite, Jon Bookout
 Peter Parker - Colin Follenweider
 Green Goblin - Gary Martin, Ottavio Gesmundo
 Harry Osborn - Gary Martin
 Mary Jane Watson - Julie Leedes
 J. Jonah Jameson - David Hutson
 Aunt May - Patricia Wilcox
 Crusher - Mike Withycombe
 Sports Commentators - Kevin Shinick, Paul Rubin
 Ring Girl - Janelle DeMarzo
 Henchman - Eric D. Braun, Jon Bookout, Sean Colon
 News Anchor - Sonya Rokes
 Cops - Mike Moran, Naomi Brenkman, Michael Dean
 Professor Mason - Michael Souveroff

See also
 Marvel Universe Live!
 Spider-Man's wedding (live performance)

References

External links
 SPIDERMAN LIVE! A Stunt Spectacular, image gallery on mike-o-matic.com

Works based on Marvel Comics
Spider-Man in live performances